Michael Grant Gates (born September 20, 1956) is a former second baseman in Major League Baseball. He played for the Montreal Expos.

References

External links

1956 births
Living people
All-American college baseball players
American expatriate baseball players in Canada
Baseball players from California
Denver Bears players
Indianapolis Indians players
Major League Baseball second basemen
Memphis Chicks players
Montreal Expos players
People from Culver City, California
Pepperdine Waves baseball players
Rochester Red Wings players
West Palm Beach Expos players
Wichita Aeros players
Anchorage Glacier Pilots players